Sony Ericsson Xperia Neo is an Android smartphone by Sony Ericsson that supersedes the Sony Ericsson Vivaz. It was launched in early 2011. During its development it was codenamed Hallon.

Hardware 
The Xperia Neo has many of the same features found in the Xperia Arc and the Xperia Play including the mobile Sony Bravia engine and an 8-megapixel camera capable of recording 720p high-definition video. It also features a front-facing VGA camera - excluded from the Xperia Arc - which allows for video chat.

Reception 
Generally, the phone has received positive reviews from sites such as GSMArena, being praised for its camera and Android operating system as opposed to the Symbian equivalent used for the Vivaz.

Software
The phone shipped with Android 2.3 and an official update to Android 4.0 was made available in May 2012. Sony Ericsson, by then going under the name Sony Mobile, did not make any higher Android version updates available for the Xperia neo.
Unofficial updates up to Android 4.4 are available.

Xperia Neo V 
A similar model named Xperia Neo V was released in October 2011. Unlike the Xperia Neo, it has a 5-megapixel camera without Exmor R. Sony Ericsson has stated that it is due to a shortage of 8-megapixel camera sensors. The other specifications are exactly the same, apart from internet speed, which is slower as compared to Sony Ericsson Neo.

See also
 Sony Ericsson Xperia Arc
 List of Android devices
 Qualcomm Snapdragon S2

References

External links
Sony Ericsson

Android (operating system) devices
Sony Ericsson smartphones
Mobile phones introduced in 2011